TES is used to make buffer solutions. It has a pKa value of 7.550 (I=0, 25°C). It is one of the Good's buffers and can be used to make buffer solutions in the pH range 6.8–8.2. It is one of the components of  Test yolk buffer medium used for refrigeration and transport of semen.

References 

Buffer solutions
Sulfonic acids
Primary alcohols
Triols
Amines